The Peterborough City Council is a city council that governs Peterborough, Ontario, Canada. It consists of the mayor of Peterborough, Diane Therrien and ten councillors, who are elected in five two-member wards across the city. Each member serves on various city committees. The council meets on Monday evenings on a three-week rotating basis.

Members

2018-2022 Council
Council elected in the 2018 Peterborough municipal elections.

References

Municipal councils in Ontario
Politics of Peterborough, Ontario